Euclid Avenue may refer to:

 California State Route 83 or Euclid Avenue in San Bernardino County, California
 Euclid Avenue (Ontario and Upland, California), a historic district 
 Euclid Avenue station (San Diego Trolley), California, a railway station
 the main street in Central West End, St. Louis, Missouri
 Euclid Avenue School, Jamestown, New York
 Euclid Avenue station (IND Fulton Street Line), a subway station in New York City
 Euclid Avenue (Cleveland), Ohio
 Euclid Avenue Historic District (Cleveland, Ohio)
 Euclid Avenue station (Pennsylvania Railroad)
 Euclid Avenue Historic District (Bristol, Virginia)